The Premier Fresh Australia is an Australia-based fresh fruits and vegetables supply chain company. Its business is regarded as the second biggest in Australia in fresh fruit and vegetables.

In August 2022, the company was renamed as 'Premier Fresh Australia', changing from its merger name 'LaManna Premier Group'.

References

Food and drink companies of Australia